Kiira Riihijärvi (born 29 April 1997) is a Finnish professional golfer. In 2022, she won the Ann Arbor's Road to the LPGA on the Epson Tour, and finished 4th on the money list to graduate to the LPGA Tour.

Amateur career
Riihijärvi was raised in Oulu, Finland and attended Darlington School in Rome, Georgia, graduating in 2016. She attended University of Tampa between 2016 and 2021. Playing golf with the Tampa Spartans women's golf team, she was named All-American four times and won 12 events. She was Sunshine State Conference Player of the Year as a junior, and NCAA Division II Player of the Year as a senior.

Riihijärvi represented Finland at the 2018 Espirito Santo Trophy, and several times at the European Ladies' Team Championship. She won the Finnish Amateur Championship in 2019 and 2020.

She finished 28th at the 2021 Augusta National Women's Amateur, and her highest World Amateur Golf Ranking was #18.

Professional career
Riihijärvi turned professional after graduating in 2021. In July, she appeared in her home country's Ladies European Tour event, the Gant Ladies Open, and finished 8th, six strokes behind winner Matilda Castren.

In 2022, she joined the Epson Tour, where she grabbed her first professional win at Ann Arbor's Road to the LPGA in June. In August, she lost a playoff at the Four Winds Invitational. She finished 4th in the rankings to graduate to the LPGA Tour for 2023.

Amateur wins
2017 NCAA D2 Super Region 2
2018 Finnish U21 Stroke Play Championship
2019 SSC Championship, Finnish Amateur Championship, Lady Falcon Invitational, NSU Shark Invitational
2020 Peggy Kirk Bell Invitational, Finnish Stroke Play Championship, Finnish Amateur Championship
2021 Peggy Kirk Bell Invitational, Barry University Invitational, NCAA D2 South Regional

Source:

Professional wins (1)

Symetra Tour wins (1)

Team appearances
Amateur
European Ladies' Team Championship (representing Finland): 2017, 2018, 2019
Espirito Santo Trophy (representing Finland): 2018

Source:

References

External links

Finnish female golfers
LPGA Tour golfers
Tampa Spartans women's golfers
Sportspeople from Oulu
1997 births
Living people